Bauser is a surname of German origin, originating as a nickname for a heavy drinker or eater. Notable people with the surname include:

Adolf Bauser (1880-1948), German teacher
Ronnie Bauser (1928-2017), South African rugby union player

See also
Bauer (surname)